Marc Tanguay is a Quebecois politician and a member of the National Assembly of Quebec for the LaFontaine electoral district.

On September 26, 2009, he was elected president of the Quebec Liberal Party. He is a lawyer by profession, and studied political science at Université Laval and law at Université de Montréal.

He was elected in a by-election held on June 11, 2012, which was triggered by the resignation of Tony Tomassi on May 3, 2012. Prior to that, he was an unsuccessful Liberal candidate in the 2007 general election in Chambly electoral district, finishing third.

On November 10, 2022, he was named interim leader of the Quebec Liberal Party following the resignation of Dominique Anglade.

References

External links
 

Living people
Canadian political party presidents
Quebec Liberal Party MNAs
21st-century Canadian politicians
Year of birth missing (living people)